Just William is a British television series based on the Just William series of books by Richmal Crompton. It aired for two series, between 1977 and 1978, on ITV. The series starred child actors Adrian Dannatt as William and Bonnie Langford as Violet, as well as established film star Diana Dors as Mrs Bott.

Cast
 Adrian Dannatt as William Brown
 Hugh Cross as Mr Brown
 Diana Fairfax as Mrs Brown
 Stacy Dorning as Ethel Brown
 Simon Chandler as Robert Brown
 Bonnie Langford as Violet Elizabeth Bott
 Michael McVey as Ginger
 Craig McFarlane as Henry
 Tim Rose as Douglas
 John Stratton as Mr Bott
 Diana Dors as Mrs Bott

Episodes

Series One
 "William and the Begging Letter"
 "William the Great Actor"
 "The Outlaws and the Tramp"
 "The Sweet Little Girl in White"
 "William and the Badminton Racket"
 "A Little Interlude"
 "William and the Prize Pig"
 "William and the Wonderful Present"
 "William the Matchmaker"
 "Waste Paper Please"
 "Only Just in Time"
 "William and the Sleeping Major"
 "William Clears the Slums"

Series Two
 "William's Lucky Day"
 "The Great Detective"
 "Violet Elizabeth Wins"
 "William Holds the Stage"
 "William the Philanthropist"
 "It All Began with the Typewriter"
 "A Rescue Party"
 "William Finds a Job"
 "Parrots for Ethel"
 "William's Worst Christmas"
 "William at the Garden Party"
 "Two Good Turns"
 "Finding a School for William"
 "William and the Tramp"

Merchandise
Two annuals based on the series were published by World Distributors (Manchester) Ltd. for 1978 and 1979 (published in late 1977 and 1978 respectively). These consisted mainly of features, games and activities, with picture strip stories also included.

Both series of Just William have been released on DVD by Network. Series One (released 18 May 2009) and Series Two (released 24 September 2009) are available individually as 2-disc sets, and also packaged together as Just William: The Complete Series.

References

External links 
 

1977 British television series debuts
1978 British television series endings
1970s British children's television series
ITV children's television shows
ITV comedy-dramas
Just William
London Weekend Television shows
British television shows based on children's books
Television series by ITV Studios